The Gonam (Guonaam) is a river in Yakutia in Russia, a left tributary of the Uchur (Lena's basin). Its main tributaries are the Sutam and Algama.

See also
List of rivers of Russia

References 

Rivers of the Sakha Republic